The FIBT World Championships 1985 took place in Cervinia, Italy for the third time, having hosted the event previously in 1971 and 1975. Except for competitions in St. Moritz, Switzerland and Cortina d'Ampezzo, Italy, it would be the last time a championship would be hosted on a naturally refrigerated track with all other competitions taking place on artificially refrigerated ones.

Two man bobsleigh

The Soviets earned their first medal at these championships.

Four man bobsleigh

Medal table

References
2-Man bobsleigh World Champions
4-Man bobsleigh World Champions

IBSF World Championships
1985 in bobsleigh
International sports competitions hosted by Italy
Bobsleigh in Italy 
1958 in Italian sport